"Liar" is an English language song by the Norwegian urban duo Madcon, from their third studio album, An InCONvenient Truth. The song was written by Kim Ofstad, Jonny Sjo, Hitesh Ceon, Yosef Woldemariam and Tshawe Shoore Baqwa and was released in 2008 in Norway, and on 20 February 2009 in the UK.  The song reached number 2 in Norway and number 65 in Germany.

Track listing

Credits and personnel
Lead vocals – Madcon
Music – Kim Ofstad, Jonny Sjo, Hitesh Ceon, Yosef Woldemariam, Tshawe Shoore Baqwa
Lyrics – Kim Ofstad, Jonny Sjo, Hitesh Ceon, Yosef Woldemariam, Tshawe Shoore Baqwa
Label: RCA Records

Chart performance

References

2008 singles
2008 songs
RCA Records singles
Songs written by Kim Ofstad
Songs written by Hitesh Ceon